Dave Boncek is a retired American soccer defender who played professionally in the  Major Indoor Soccer League.  He was the 1986 MISL Rookie of the Year.

In 1981, Boncek graduated from St. Mary's High School.  He was inducted into the school's Hall of Fame in 2002.  Boncek attended Indiana University, playing on the men's soccer team from 1981 to 1984.  In 1982 and 1983, the Hoosiers won the NCAA Division I Men's Soccer Championship.

In June 1985, the Kansas City Comets selected Boncek in the first round (fifth overall) of the Major Indoor Soccer League draft.  He was the 1986 MISL Rookie of the Year.  Boncek played for the Comets until the team released him in October 1989.  On January 3, 1990, Boncek returned to the Comets for the remainder of the 1989–1990 season.

External links
 MISL stats

References

Living people
1963 births
Soccer players from St. Louis
American soccer players
Indiana Hoosiers men's soccer players
Kansas City Comets (original MISL) players
Major Indoor Soccer League (1978–1992) players
Association football defenders